"Place Your Hands" is a song recorded by the English band Reef. It was released on 21 October 1996, as the first single from the band's second album, Glow (1997). It peaked at number six on the UK Singles Chart and is Reef’s most successful single to date, and also their best known hit.

Background
The song explains the grief that vocalist Gary Stringer felt following the death of his grandfather, and easing the pain of death.

It established the band's popularity, appealing both to the then-current tendency for "laddishness" and to older rock fans. In the USA, it owed much of its success to young cable music channel M2, which played the video heavily and led to it becoming a "Buzz Clip" on the main MTV channel. In turn, the song provided a major boost for their second album Glow, which entered the UK Albums Chart at number one.

Critical reception
Larry Flick from Billboard wrote: “What really draws you into this song is the initial guitar and bass intro, which is quite catchy. The lyrics, however, seem a bit rough and choppy. An interesting facet of the song is the gospel-like repetitive chorus, which seems to fit the track remarkably well, soothing the listener a bit from the tough solo vocals.” British magazine Music Week rated it five out of five, picking it as Single of the Week. The reviewer added, "A fantastic comeback single from the rockers who have been recording with producer George Drakoulias to create a really funky rock sound. Deserves to be huge." David Sinclair from The Times noted "the infectious feel" of "Place Your Hands".

Music video
The accompanying music video for "Place Your Hands", directed by David Mould, features the band members on pulleys and wires to create an energetic aerial display. It was published on YouTube in September 2011. The video has amassed more than 4.8 million views as of September 2021.

Charts

Certifications

References

1996 singles
Reef (band) songs
1996 songs
S2 Records singles